Rattlesnake Island is one of the islands South of the Great Palm Island group, northwest of Magnetic Island and directly east of Rollingstone in the Halifax Bay, northern Queensland, Australia.

RAAF Base Townsville (No. 323 Combat Support Squadron RAAF) conducts live firing with military aircraft on regular occasions. When the RAAF are not live firing, they also conduct survival courses on the island.

September 1943 B-25 Mitchell crash
On 23 September 1943, a B-25 Mitchell bomber crashed 3 miles off the island, while undergoing a live firing test.

See also 
 List of islands of Queensland

References

Islands on the Great Barrier Reef
North Queensland